Cerdac may refer to several villages in Romania:

 Cerdac, a village in the town of Slănic-Moldova, Bacău County
 Cerdac, a village in Golești, Vrancea